The Taxpayers Protection Alliance is a non-profit advocacy group based in Washington, D.C. The group monitors federal spending and issues reports, research, and analyses on spending and taxation it believes to be in excess.

History

The Taxpayers Protection Alliance (TPA) was founded in 2011 with David Williams as its president (a title he continues to hold as of June 2022). In July 2011 in conjunction with Our Generation, the organization issued a report on the salaries and fringe benefits earned by members of Congress entitled "Are taxpayers getting their money's worth?". In November of that year, the TPA was one of five taxpayer advocacy groups to sign a letter calling for a 10% reduction in pay for Congress members.

In April 2012, the TPA and other groups called on Republican presidential candidate, Newt Gingrich, to relinquish his Secret Service protection. Gingrich lost his protection the following week. Over the course of 2013 and 2014, the organization issued reports on topics like the public costs of LEED certification, defense spending, and congressional salaries. The group also began levying criticism against municipal broadband projects using fiber optic cables for connectivity.

In September 2015, the TPA issued a report called "Sacking Taxpayers: How NFL Stadium Subsidies Waste Money and Fall Short on Their Promises of Economic Development" which detailed the amount of money spent by taxpayers on publicly subsidized National Football League stadiums. Later that year, the organization issued a report (in conjunction with the Animal Justice Project) on the taxpayer costs associated with scientific experiments that administer narcotics to animals. The TPA also issued criticisms of the United States Postal Service because it was operating in debt. In 2017, the group started a social media campaign to oppose a proposed municipal broadband project in Louisville, Kentucky, claiming that the cost outweighed the benefits.

In July 2018, TPA president David Williams wrote an open letter to the White House that was critical of the Trump administration's issuance of tariffs as part of the United States' ongoing trade war with China. In April 2019, the organization itself wrote a joint letter (with Tariffs Hurt the Heartland) to Treasury Secretary, Steve Mnuchin, condemning the tariffs.

References

External links
Official website

Taxpayer groups
Political advocacy groups in the United States
Organizations established in 2011